Anthology Resource Vol. 1: △△ is a soundtrack album for the third season of the television series Twin Peaks by supervising sound editor and mixer Dean Hurley. It features incidental tracks produced by Hurley under direction of frequent collaborator David Lynch as series sound designer. These tracks consist of ambient instrumental underscore and diegetic soundscapes showcased throughout the third season. The album was produced largely with analogue sound sources, designed to lend "sonic impact and emotional color to Lynch's vision."

Track listing

References

2017 soundtrack albums
Music of Twin Peaks
Sacred Bones Records soundtracks
Twin Peaks